Quiina schippii is a species of plant in the family Ochnaceae. It is found in Belize, Honduras, and possibly Guatemala.

References

Ochnaceae
Flora of Belize
Flora of Honduras
Flora of Guatemala
Endangered flora of North America
Taxonomy articles created by Polbot